F.C. United of Manchester is an English semi-professional association football club based in Moston, Manchester, that competes in the Northern Premier League Premier Division.  The club was formed in June 2005 by supporters of Manchester United opposed to American businessman Malcolm Glazer's takeover of that club. F.C. United are owned and democratically run by their supporters and operate as a community benefit society on a one-member, one vote basis.

F.C. United were accepted into Division Two of the North West Counties Football League, at level ten of the English football pyramid, for the 2005–06 season. They achieved three consecutive promotions in the first three years of their existence and were promoted for a fourth time to compete in the National League North for the 2015–16 season.

F.C. United reached the second round of the FA Cup during the 2010–11 season, and the first round during the 2015–16 season. The club also reached the fourth round of the FA Trophy during the 2014–15 season and the third round of the FA Vase during the 2006–07 season. In minor competitions, F.C. United won the Manchester Premier Cup during the 2016–17 season, the North West Counties Football League Challenge Cup during the 2006–07 season and the Northern Premier League President's Cup during the 2007–08 season.

Due to the lack of their own ground, F.C. United played their home matches at multiple stadia around Greater Manchester between 2005 and 2015, including Bury's Gigg Lane, Curzon Ashton's Tameside Stadium and Stalybridge Celtic's Bower Fold, among others. The club moved into its own 4,400-capacity Broadhurst Park in north-east Manchester for the 2015–16 season.

Key
The division is shown in italics when it changes due to promotion, relegation or league reorganisation.

Key to league record
P = Games played
W = Games won
D = Games drawn
L = Games lost
F = Goals for
A = Goals against

GD = Goal Differential
Pts = Points
Pos = League position

Key to rounds
DNE = Did Not Enter
PR = Preliminary Round
QR1 = Qualifying round 1
QR2 = Qualifying round 2
QR3 = Qualifying round 3
QR4 = Qualifying round 4

R1 = Round 1
R2 = Round 2
R3 = Round 3
R4 = Round 4
QF = Quarter-finals
SF = Semi-finals
W = Winners

Key to goalscorers
  = Number of league goals scored

Seasons

Notes

References 

Seasons
F.C. United of Manchester